The 1972 All-Ireland Under-21 Hurling Championship was the 9th staging of the All-Ireland Under-21 Hurling Championship since its establishment by the Gaelic Athletic Association in 1964.

Cork were the defending champions, however, they were defeated by Clare in the Munster quarter-final.

On 10 September 1972, Galway won the championship following a 2-9 to 1-10 defeat of Dublin in the All-Ireland final. This was their first All-Ireland title in the under-21 grade.

Results

Leinster Under-21 Hurling Championship

Final

Munster Under-21 Hurling Championship

First round

Semi-finals

Final

All-Ireland Under-21 Hurling Championship

Semi-finals

Final

Championship statistics

Miscellaneous

 The All-Ireland final between Galway and Dublin was the very first championship meeting between the two teams. Both sides were hoping to win their first All-Ireland title.

References

Under
All-Ireland Under-21 Hurling Championship